Gordon Quiller Orchardson (1885 – 1969) was a Scottish field hockey player who competed in the 1908 Summer Olympics. In 1908 he won the bronze medal as member of the Scotland team.

References

External links
 
profile

1885 births
1969 deaths
Scottish male field hockey players
Olympic field hockey players of Great Britain
British male field hockey players
Field hockey players at the 1908 Summer Olympics
Olympic bronze medallists for Great Britain
Olympic medalists in field hockey
Scottish Olympic medallists
Medalists at the 1908 Summer Olympics